Charles Coulston Gillispie (August 6, 1918 – October 6, 2015) was an American historian of science. He was the Dayton-Stockton Professor of History of Science, Emeritus at Princeton University. He was succeeded by Arno J. Mayer.

Life
The son of Raymond Livingston Gillispie and Virginia Coulston, Gillispie grew up in Bethlehem, Pennsylvania. He attended Wesleyan University, graduating in 1940 with a major in Chemistry and gained his PhD from Harvard University in 1949. He also served in the U.S. Army during World War II.

Gillispie joined the Department of History at Princeton University, establishing the Princeton Program in History of Science in the 1960s. He was elected a member of the American Academy of Arts and Sciences in 1963. He was president of the History of Science Society in 1965–66. In 1972, he was elected to the American Philosophical Society. He headed the editorial board of the Dictionary of Scientific Biography, for which he received the Dartmouth Medal in 1981. Gillispie also received the Pfizer Award in 1981. He was awarded the George Sarton Medal by the History of Science Society in 1984 and the Balzan Prize in 1997 for "the extraordinary contribution he has made to the history and philosophy of science by his intellectually vigorous, precise works, as well as his editing of a great reference work".

He died on October 6, 2015 at the age of 97.

Works
Genesis and geology: a study in the relations of scientific thought, natural theology, and social opinion in Britain, 1790-1850, 1951 
The edge of objectivity: an essay in the history of scientific ideas, 1960 
Lazare Carnot, savant, 1971 
Science and polity in France at the end of the old regime, 1980.   Winner of the 1981 Pfizer Award.
Science and Polity in France: The Revolutionary and Napoleonic Years (2004) 
The Montgolfier brothers and the invention of aviation, 1783-1784, 1983  
 
Pierre-Simon Laplace, 1749-1827: a life in exact science, 1997  
 
Essays and reviews in history and history of science, 2006

References

Further reading
 Jed Z. Buchwald [Editor]: A Master of Science History: Essays in Honor of Charles Coulston Gillispie. Springer, 2012.  (print);  (eBook)

External links
Web page at Princeton University

 

American historians of science
Princeton University faculty
South Kent School alumni
Wesleyan University alumni
Harvard University alumni
1918 births
2015 deaths
United States Army personnel of World War II
Historians from Connecticut
Members of the American Philosophical Society